Robert J. Gamble (February 6, 1867 – August 4, 1958) was a 19th-century Major League Baseball player.

External links
Baseball Reference

Major League Baseball pitchers
19th-century baseball players
Philadelphia Athletics (AA) players
1867 births
Binghamton Crickets (1880s) players
Lewiston Independents players
Williamsport Lumber Citys players
Hazleton Pugilists players
Harrisburg Ponies players
Reading Actives players
1958 deaths
Baseball players from Pennsylvania